Ceratoxanthis externana is a species of moth of the family Tortricidae. It is found in Russia (the southern Ural, Caucasus) and Turkmenistan.

The wingspan is 15–19 mm. Adults have been recorded on wing from June to July.

References

Moths described in 1844
Cochylini